Torsten Kienass (born 23 February 1971) is a German ice hockey player. He competed in the men's tournament at the 1994 Winter Olympics.

Career statistics

Regular season and playoffs

International

References

External links
 

1971 births
Living people
Olympic ice hockey players of Germany
Ice hockey players at the 1994 Winter Olympics
People from East Berlin
Ice hockey people from Berlin
Boston Bruins draft picks
SC Dynamo Berlin (ice hockey) players
Düsseldorfer EG players
Nürnberg Ice Tigers players
Füchse Duisburg players
Essen Mosquitoes players
DEG Metro Stars players
Ratingen EC players